Krisztián Géresi (born 14 June 1994) is a Hungarian football player who plays for Szeged-Csanád on loan from Vasas.

Club career
On 2 December 2015 he was signed by Nemzeti Bajnokság I club Videoton.

On 26 March it was announced by Marko Nikolić, manager of Videoton FC, that Géresi could not play in the remaining rounds of the 2017–18 Nemzeti Bajnokság I season.

On 10 June 2022, Géresi signed a two-year contract with Vasas. He did not establish himself as a starter in the first half of the season, and on 14 February 2023 Géresi moved on loan to Szeged-Csanád.

International career
He made his debut for Hungary national football team on 28 March 2021 in a World Cup qualifier against San Marino.

Club statistics

Updated to games played as of 15 May 2022.

Honours
Videoton
 Nemzeti Bajnokság I: 2017–18

References

External links
 Vidi.hu Official Website
 
 

1994 births
Sportspeople from Székesfehérvár
Living people
Hungarian footballers
Hungary under-21 international footballers
Hungary international footballers
Association football midfielders
Fehérvár FC players
Puskás Akadémia FC players
Vasas SC players
Szeged-Csanád Grosics Akadémia footballers
Nemzeti Bajnokság I players
Nemzeti Bajnokság II players